Elections to South Cambridgeshire District Council took place on Thursday 10 June 2004, as part of the 2004 United Kingdom local elections and at the same time as the European Parliament election, 2004. Due to new ward boundaries, all 57 seats on the council were up for election, increasing the number of councillors by two. Seats up for election in 2004 were subsequently contested by thirds at the 2006, 2007 and 2008 elections.

Summary
The Conservative Party remained the largest party while the Liberal Democrats made gains, but the council remained under no overall control. Labour lost two seats, halving their representation on the council.

Results

Results by ward

B

C

D

F

G

H

L

M

O

P

S

T

W

References

2004
2004 English local elections
2000s in Cambridgeshire